Yuriy Volodymyrovych Malyey (born 18 April 1985) is a Ukrainian football striker who currently plays for Dinaz Vyshhorod.

Career
Yuriy, started his career with Yunist Chernihiv, the school of soccer in Chernihiv where few famous player such as Andriy Yarmolenko got graduated in soccer.

YSB Chernihiv
In 2011 he moved to YSB Chernihiv. Here he won the Chernihiv Oblast Football Cup in 2012.

Desna Chernihiv
He played also for Desna Chernihiv in Ukrainian Second League, where he got second in the season 2011–12.

Barsa Sumy, Hirnyk-SportHorishni Plavni, and Obolon-Brovar Kyiv
He played also for Barsa Sumy, Hirnyk-Sport Horishni Plavni, Obolon-Brovar Kyiv. In 2017 he moved to Polissya Zhytomyr, then in Myr Hornostayivka and in Nyva Vinnytsia.

Cherkashchyna
In 2019 he moved to Cherkashchyna.

Podillya Khmelnytskyi
In 2021 he moved to Podillya Khmelnytskyi. On 25 March 2021, he played his first match with the new club, against Karpaty Lviv in Ukrainian Second League ended 4-1. With the club won Ukrainian Second League of the season 2020–21.

Dinaz Vyshhorod
On 16 July 2021 signed for Dinaz Vyshhorod in Ukrainian Second League. On 31 July 2021 he made his debut with the new club against Dnipro Cherkasy, replacing Oleksandr Apanchuk at he 46 minute. On 18 August 2021 he played in Ukrainian Cup for the Second preliminary round, against Obolon Kyiv in the season 2021–22. On 18 September 2021 he scored his first goal with the new club against Nyva Vinnytsia in Ukrainian Second League in the season 2021–22 at the Dinaz Stadium in Lyutizh.

Honours

Club

YSB Chernihiv
 Chernihiv Oblast Championship runner-up: 2011
 Chernihiv Oblast Cup runner-up: 2012

Podillya Khmelnytskyi
 Ukrainian Second League runner-up: 2020–21

References

External links
 Official Profile of FC Podillya
 
 Profile on Official website of Ukrainian Second League
 Facebook

1992 births
Living people
Footballers from Chernihiv
Soviet footballers
Ukrainian footballers
Association football defenders
FC Yunist Chernihiv players
FC Avanhard Koriukivka players
FC Chernihiv players
FC Desna Chernihiv players
FC Hirnyk-Sport Horishni Plavni players
FC Obolon-Brovar Kyiv players
FC Polissya Zhytomyr players
FC Myr Hornostayivka players
FC Nyva Vinnytsia players
FC Cherkashchyna players
FC Podillya Khmelnytskyi players
FC Kudrivka players
FC Dinaz Vyshhorod players
Ukrainian Second League players